Sanjeev Shrivastva is an Indian professor and casual dancer in Bhabha University, Bhopal. He is from Vidisha Madhya Pradesh. He gained popularity after a dance video went viral.  The video was shot on 12 May during the ladies’ ‘sangeet’ (music) ceremony from a marriage of his brother-in-law in Gwalior (MP).  He was dancing to a song by super star Govinda. Film star Govinda also watched that video and gave his reaction. After that video, Shrivastva met superstar Salman Khan and Govinda. Srivastava is a professor of electronics engineering  at Bhopal's Bhabha Engineering Research Institute. His dance inspired by the Govinda-starrer  Bollywood film 'Khudgarz'. Srivastava was an aspiring dancer during his younger years and has been doing dance shows since 1982. His phones has not stopped ringing ever since the video went viral and he reportedly had to take Friday off to field calls from, fans friends and the media.
The professor from Vidhisha, Madhya Pradesh, The video started to trend on social media, politicians and the Bollywood crowd, as Srivastava has drawn praises from celebrities like Raveena Tandon, Divya Dutta and political bigwigs such as Madhya Pradesh Chief Minister Shivaraj Singh Chouhan. Sanjeev Srivastava, 46 appointed the brand ambassador by Vidisha Municipal Corporation. He has completed his degree from Priyadarshini College of Engineering, Nagpur.

References

Living people
Indian Internet celebrities
Viral videos
Year of birth missing (living people)